The 2022 PointsBet Invitational curling tournament was held from September 21 to 25 at the Willie O'Ree Place in Fredericton, New Brunswick. The event featured thirty-two Canadian teams and was the first major event of the "Season of Champions" of the 2022–23 season. It was played in a single-elimination tournament with the winning men's and women's teams of Reid Carruthers and Jennifer Jones receiving $50,000 each.

Qualification
The top 12 ranked men's and women's Canadian teams on the revamped World Curling Federation's world team rankings qualified for the event. A local men's and women's team also qualified, which was selected by the host committee. Additionally, the reigning men's and women's champions of the 2022 Canadian Junior Curling Championships received a berth, along with the reigning men's and women's champions of the 2021 Canadian Curling Club Championships. The final spot was decided by a fan vote.

Men
Top world team ranking men's teams:
 Brad Gushue
 Brendan Bottcher
 Matt Dunstone
 Kevin Koe
 Reid Carruthers
 Glenn Howard
 Colton Flasch
 Tanner Horgan
 John Epping
 Mike McEwen
 Kody Hartung
 Karsten Sturmay
 Félix Asselin
 Braden Calvert

Host team:
 Jack Smeltzer

Junior champions:
 Landan Rooney

Club champions:
 Nick Deagle

Women
Top world team ranking women's teams:
 Kerri Einarson
 Kaitlyn Lawes
 Tracy Fleury
 Chelsea Carey
 Jennifer Jones
 Krista McCarville
 Casey Scheidegger
 Hollie Duncan
 Kelsey Rocque
 Christina Black
 Penny Barker
 Kerry Galusha
 Andrea Kelly
 Selena Sturmay

Host team:
 Andrea Kelly

Junior champions:
 Emily Deschenes

Club champions:
 Tracy Larocque

Fan vote
A fan vote was held from August 22 to 24 to determine the final men's and women's teams competing at the event.

Men

Women

Men

Teams
The teams are listed as follows:

Bracket

Knockout results
All draw times listed in Atlantic Time (UTC-03:00).

Round of 16
Wednesday, September 21, 7:00 pm

Thursday, September 22, 7:00 pm

Quarterfinals
Friday, September 23, 4:00 pm

Semifinals
Saturday, September 24, 4:00 pm

Final
Sunday, September 25, 3:30 pm

Women

Teams
The teams are listed as follows:

Knockout bracket

Knockout results
All draw times listed in Atlantic Time (UTC-03:00).

Round of 16
Wednesday, September 21, 2:00 pm

Thursday, September 22, 2:00 pm

Quarterfinals
Friday, September 23, 11:00 am

Semifinals
Saturday, September 24, 11:00 am

Final
Sunday, September 25, 10:30 am

Celebrity invitational
The event will also hold two celebrity exhibition games following the 'Elite 8' portion of the tournament. The teams will consist of: 

Brendan Bottcher, B. J. Neufeld, Briane Harris and actor Patrick Roach
Jennifer Jones, Kevin Koe, and hockey players Marc Methot and Shayne Corson
Mark Nichols, Val Sweeting, soccer player Stephanie Labbé and rapper Classified
Kaitlyn Lawes, Ben Hebert, cyclist Georgia Simmerling and sprinter Donovan Bailey

Notes

References

External links

2022 in Canadian curling
2022 in New Brunswick
PointsBet Invitational
Curling competitions in Fredericton